Brassiantha is a genus of flowering plants belonging to the family Celastraceae.

Its native range is New Guinea.

Species:

Brassiantha hedraiantheroides 
Brassiantha pentamera

References

Celastraceae
Celastrales genera
Taxa named by Albert Charles Smith